The 2017–18 Fortuna Düsseldorf season was the 123rd season in the football club's history. For the 5th consecutive season, Düsseldorf played in the 2. Bundesliga. They also participated in this season's edition of the domestic cup, the DFB-Pokal. The season covers a period from 1 July 2017 to 30 June 2018.

Players

Squad information

Competitions

Bundesliga

League table

Results summary

Results by round

Matches

DFB-Pokal

References

Fortuna Düsseldorf seasons
Dusseldorf, Fortuna